Chen Je-chang (born 30 December 1973 in Taiwan) is a former Taiwanese professional baseball catcher who had played for Brother Elephants of Chinese Professional Baseball League. He currently plays as catcher and bullpen coach for the Elephants. He is the oldest current player of Brother Elephants. Besides, His younger brother is Chen Je-cheng (陳瑞振), who plays as third baseman in the same team. particularly, he has been hit by pitcher 100 times in baseball career, also CPBL highest record.

Career statistics

See also
 Chinese Professional Baseball League
 Brother Elephants

References

External links
 

1973 births
Living people
Baseball catchers
Brother Elephants coaches
Brother Elephants players
People from Chiayi County
Taiwanese baseball players
Uni-President 7-Eleven Lions coaches